Zagustay (Zagahatai) is a rural locality (an ulus) in Kizhinginsky District, Republic of Buryatia, Russia. The population was 1,199 as of 2010. There are 11 streets.

Geography 
Zagustay is located 68 km east of Kizhinga (the district's administrative centre) by road. Khurtey is the nearest rural locality.

References 

Rural localities in Kizhinginsky District